Shengjing Bank (in ) is a commercial bank, with its headquarters in Shenyang, Liaoning Province, China. It was established in 1996 as Shenyang City Commercial Bank and opened in Shenyang City only.  It changed its name to Shengjing Bank in 2007 and has since opened branches in  Beijing, Tianjin, Dalian, Yingkou, Huludao, Shanghai, Anshan, Changchun, Benxi, Panjin, Chaoyang, Fushun, Jinzhou, Fuxin, Dandong and Liaoyang.

As of fiscal year 2012/2013, Shengjing Bank's total assets were RMB355,432 million. Shenyang Hengxin owns approximately of 10.9% of equity interest in Shengjing Bank. Shenyang SASAC indirectly holds 100% interest in Shenyang Hengxin.

In 2014, Shengjing Bank wanted "to raise about $1.3 billion in a Hong Kong initial public offering".  China Merchants Securities sponsored the initial public offering.

In 2015, Shengjing Bank announced it would issue "offshore RMB bonds".

See also
 Shenyang
 Banking in China
 Commercial banks in Northeast China
Dalian Bank, Shengjing Bank (Shenyang), Bank of Jilin (Changchun), Harbin Bank, etc.

References

External links
 Shengjing Bank's official site   (in Chinese)

Companies based in Shenyang
Banks of China
Companies listed on the Hong Kong Stock Exchange